Tobias Segal is an American actor, best known for his work on stage and in the independent film The Other America, which appeared at the SlamDance Film Festival and Philadelphia Film Festival in April 2004.
In 2002 he became one of the youngest actors to win a Barrymore Award, which he won for Outstanding Supporting Actor in a play for his performance in Equus. He appeared in The Bridge Project at Kevin Spacey's Old Vic Theatre (spring and summer 2009) under the direction of Sam Mendes, followed by a brief Broadway run of The Miracle Worker, before portraying Earl in the John Wick films John Wick: Chapter 2 and John Wick: Chapter 3 – Parabellum. In 2022, Segal portrayed the white version of Donald Glover's Earnest "Earn" Marks in the character's dream episodes of the third season of Atlanta, referred to as "E". He currently lives in Brooklyn, New York.

Early life
Segal was born and raised in Chester County, Pennsylvania, and has been active in the theatre community in Philadelphia. In 2004 Segal took a break from Temple University to work with area professional theaters.

Career
Over the past few years, Segal has made appearances on Law & Order and in 2006 he appeared in the major motion picture Rocky Balboa. He also acted in such plays as Merlin's Fire, Twelfth Night, Disco Pigs, and According to Goldman.

In Fall 2011, he played the character "U. Gene" on the Fox science-fiction series Fringe. In 2011, he appeared in Body of Proof in episode 3, "Helping Hand". In 2012, he starred in the independent comedy-drama Petunia opposite Thora Birch and Michael Urie. He won a Best Supporting Actor award at the Orlando Film Fest in 2013 for his role in B-Side.

Filmography

References

External links
 
 
 Tobias Segal interview

Year of birth missing (living people)
Living people
American male film actors
American male television actors
Male actors from Philadelphia